Sannantha similis is a flowering shrub or small tree species in the myrtle family, Myrtaceae. It is endemic to Australia. Plants grow to 4 metres high. White flowers appear in groups of 3 to 7 between October and January in the species' native range. These have 5 rounded petals surrounding 8 to 15 stamens. The fruits are 2.5 to 3.5 mm in diameter.

Taxonomy
The species was first formally described in 1997 as Babingtonia similis and in 2007 it was placed in the newly created genus Sannantha. For many years the name Baeckea virgata was misapplied to this species. Baeckea virgata, currently Sannantha virgata, is endemic to New Caledonia.

Distribution
The species occurs from  Port Stephens in New South Wales, northwards to Queensland.

Cultivation
The species has been cultivated for many years under various names.
Cultivars include:
'Howie's Feathertips'

References

Flora of New South Wales
Flora of Victoria (Australia)
similis
Myrtales of Australia